Merafloxacin is a fluoroquinolone antibacterial that inhibits the pseudoknot formation which is necessary for the frameshift in the SARS-CoV-2 genome. It is a promising drug candidate for SARS-CoV-2.

References 

Fluoroquinolone antibiotics
COVID-19 drug development
Secondary amino acids
Pyrrolidines